The Smith-Kettlewell Eye Research Institute is a nonprofit research institute in San Francisco, California, with a focus on vision science and rehabilitation engineering. It was founded in 1959 by Arthur Jampolsky and Alan B. Scott, when some members of Stanford University's Ophthalmology Department elected to stay in San Francisco rather than move to Palo Alto.

Scientific contributions 
The Institute did early experiments in sensory substitution, especially the substitution of tactile information for visual information to help blind people navigate and other methods to obtain accessible technology. This research is often performed by scientists who are blind, such as Josh Miele.

The institute's use of botulinum toxin in humans as a therapy to treat strabismus. This initial therapeutic use led to later cosmetic use in Botox. Other impactful work involved Anthony Norcia's study of vision in infants and Erich Sutter's invention of the multifocal electroretinogram and of the multifocal evoked potential.

The Institute has originated various visual illusions, including Christopher Tyler's development of autostereograms, and Anthony Norcia's coffer illusion. Also popular are Tyler's analysis of the position of eyes in paintings, of Mona Lisa's smile and of Leonardo da Vinci's possible eye condition.

Scientists 
Over the decades, the Institute has hosted generations of vision scientists, including

 Paul Bach-y-Rita
 Laura Busse
 Matteo Carandini
 Julie M Harris
 Suzanne McKee
 Ken Nakayama
 Anthony Norcia
 Alan B Scott
Erich Sutter
 Christopher Tyler
 Alan Yuille
 Joshua Miele

References

External links 
 ski.org
 https://barkansociety.com/partner/the-smith-kettlewell-eye-research-institute/
 https://www.afb.org/aw/15/9/15535

Medical research institutes in California
Research institutes in the San Francisco Bay Area